Long Forties is a zone of the northern North Sea that is fairly consistently  deep.

Extent 
Long Forties are between the northeast coasts of Scotland and the southwest coast of Norway, centred about 57°N 0°30′E; compare to the Broad Fourteens.

Alternative terms

Forties
The Shipping Forecast area Forties approximates, simply with neater borders, Long Forties.  The north of the latter falls in Viking.

Fladen Grounds

Fladen Grounds is the next more northern, eastern and deeper part of the sea. The Dutch weather service KNMI, and Norwegian equivalent, use their tongues' similar names for and meaning Fladen Grounds instead of Forties and most of Viking. The Swedish weather institute, which reported for this zone until 2005 followed these leads.

Etymology
When depth sounding (originally fathoming with rope and plumb weight), the recorded depth would for a long haul remain 40 fathoms. On a traditional imperial measurements nautical chart a great zone with many "40"s appears.

Geology 
It was discovered in 1970 and first produced oil in 1975 under ownership of British Petroleum.

The Forties Formation consists of a lower Shale Member and an upper Sandstone Member, which were deposited in a "middle and lower submarine fan environment". The initial development plan included a "complete replacement seawater injection system" starting in 1975.

See also 
 North Sea
 Dogger Bank has map and related places
 Broad Fourteens
 Roaring Forties
 Forties Oil Field

References 

Geography of Europe
North Sea
Shipping Forecast areas